Alluaudite is a relatively common alkaline manganese iron phosphate mineral with the chemical formula . It occurs as metasomatic replacement in granitic pegmatites and within phosphatic nodules in shales. 

It was first described in 1848 for an occurrence in Skellefteå, Västerbotten, Sweden.  It was named by Alexis Damour after François Alluaud (II) (1778–1866). The mineral structure was first described in 1955.

References

Phosphate minerals
Manganese(II) minerals
Iron(II,III) minerals
Sodium minerals
Monoclinic minerals
Minerals in space group 15